Ricardo Croy (born 7 December 1986) is a South African rugby union player, currently playing with the . His regular position is fly-half.

Career

Youth
Croy represented  at the 2004 Under-18 Craven Week tournament. This led to his inclusion in the South Africa Under-19 squad for the Under 19 Rugby World Championship in 2005. Further appearances for Western Province followed at Under-19 level in 2005 and at Under-21 level at 2006 and 2007.

Senior career

Western Province
Further appearances followed in the 2008 Vodacom Cup side, but he failed to break into the Currie Cup side.

SWD Eagles
Croy then joined George-based side the  during the 2008 Currie Cup First Division season, making four appearances. He was 5th top scorer in the 2009 Vodacom Cup, scoring 94 points. A further 48 points in the 2009 Currie Cup First Division followed to help them finish second in the league, but they failed to win promotion, despite him accumulating the highest individual tally in the play-off games, scoring 23 points.

Pumas

Boland Cavaliers

Representative rugby
In 2012, Croy was included in a South African Barbarians (South) team that faced England during the 2012 mid-year rugby test series. The following year, he was included in a South Africa President's XV team that played in the 2013 IRB Tbilisi Cup and won the tournament after winning all three matches.

References

1986 births
Living people
Boland Cavaliers players
Pumas (Currie Cup) players
Rugby union players from Bellville, South Africa
South African rugby union players
SWD Eagles players
Western Province (rugby union) players
Rugby union fly-halves